Naval tactics play a crucial role in modern battles and wars. The presence of land, changing water depths, weather, detection and electronic warfare, the speed at which actual combat occurs and other factors — especially air power — have rendered naval tactics essential to the success of any naval force.

The basis of all tactics (land, sea and air) is fire and movement: the fulfillment of a mission by the effective delivery of firepower resulting from scouting and the creation of good firing positions. Movement is the basis of modern combat; a naval fleet can travel hundreds of nautical miles in a day.

In naval warfare, the key is to detect the enemy while avoiding detection. A crucial part is to deny the detection of friendly forces through various means.

There is also the concept of battlespace: a zone around a naval force within which a commander is confident of detecting, tracking, engaging and destroying threats before they pose a danger. This is why a navy prefers the open sea. The presence of land and the bottom topology of an area compresses the battle space, limits the opportunities and ability to maneuver, allows an enemy to predict the location of the fleet, and hinders the detection of enemy forces. In shallow waters, the detection of submarines and mines is especially problematic.

One scenario that was the focus of American naval planning during the Cold War was a conflict between two modern and well equipped fleets on the high seas; a battle between the fleets of the United States and the Soviet Union. The main consideration is for Carrier Battle Groups (CVBGs).

Order of engagement 

Once a commander has considered the geography of a mission, he examines the assets the enemy is believed to have available - the enemy's order of battle (OOB); what friendly units are needed to succeed at the mission objective; and the added constraints placed by mission requirements (time etc.). This produces a path of intended motion (PIM) for the friendly forces - not the route, but the direction in which the force is heading at any time and so the area which must be checked and passed through.

As enemy forces are encountered and identified, they are categorized by potency and immediacy and the friendly OOB altered to reflect this. There are four threat classes: A, B, C and D.
 Class A is Potent and Immediate; this is a need to drop everything and respond immediately. This might be a group of sea-skimming missiles racing towards a capital ship, or something as powerless as a tug - that is radioing the fleet's position to a more distant enemy.
 Class B is Immediate only;  this requires fast action but does not threaten the mission; for example, a small boat detected in the outer screen.
 Class C is Potent only; this is a 'win' for the fleet commander: a significant threat detected far enough away that force can be massed to destroy it or to avoid it.
 Class D is Neither Immediate nor Potent; a target of opportunity which is not a threat and the destruction of which does not aid the assigned mission.

This classification is similar to the time management method of judging things to be urgent/not urgent and important/not important.

Fleet formation 
After establishing a path of intended motion, the forces are organized. The formation has several standard elements positioned according to a threat axis - the estimate of the likely direction from which an enemy attack will come. A threat axis will almost certainly change over time, as the fleet moves. There may be a single threat axis or one for each type of enemy: AAW (Anti-aircraft warfare), ASW (Anti-Submarine Warfare), and ASuW (Anti-Surface Warfare). However, in reality usually only one axis is used; the complexity of adding more tends to confuse the formation.

The positions in the formation are called station assignments. A ship's position depends on its abilities. Many modern warships can fight several ways, but some are better at certain things. AAW and ASW are the important defensive properties. ASuW conduct is usually offensive.

A standard formation provides a number of layers of defence, designed to give maximum protection to the fleet's high value units (HVUs) or main body. Furthest out are the picket ships, Combat Air Patrol (CAP) craft and airborne early warning (AEW) aircraft. These units operate at 200 nautical miles (370 km) or more out from the main body. The units of the outer screen operate between 12 and 25 nautical miles (22 and 46 km) from the main body. The inner screen is within 10 nautical miles (19 km) of the HVUs.

The ships of the outer screen are intended to detect and engage any enemy units that have bypassed the pickets. These ships must be multi-role, but there is usually an emphasis on ASW, especially passive detection. It is quieter out there than near the HVUs and so detection is easier. Preferably there are helicopter ASW assets for 'stand off' engagement. The ASW ships are usually assigned to specific sectors which allows a 'sprint and drift' detection of submarines - the ship 'sprints' to the front edge of its sector, then slowly moves back across the sector. Passive towed sonar arrays operate very efficiently on the return leg. AAW ships in the outer screen operate to protect ASW operations and to attack enemy aircraft before they reach their weapons-launching points, so range of defensive weapon is more important than rate of fire here.

The inner screen emphasis is on AAW. The central task is to engage any airborne threats that penetrate that far. This means the threat is almost certainly a missile so AAW rate of fire is important. The more defensive firepower in the air the more enemy threats will be destroyed. For ASW the inner screen needs good active sonar. Any threat this close is too serious for passive sonar as immediate targeting is needed. Checking the area around and under HVUs for submarines is called 'delousing'. If possible at least one ASW helicopter is always airborne, to target detected contacts as quickly as possible.

Detection and electronic warfare 
In modern naval combat a deadly strike can be launched from 600 nautical miles (1,100 km) away. This is a huge area to scout. The double-edged answer to this is electronic warfare.

Electronic warfare (EW) consists of three elements — Electronic Support Measures (ESM), Electronic Counter-Measures (ECM) and Electronic Counter-Counter-Measures (ECCM).

ESM is the passive detection of enemy electromagnetic (EM) emissions. The radiated energy of an emitter (e.g. radar) can be detected far beyond the range at which it returns a usable result to its user. Modern ESM can identify the actual class of the emitter, which helps identify the unit on which it is used. Passive cross-fixing between a number of units can locate a source to a reasonably small area and give some hint to direction and speed. ESM fixes are placed in three classes: Detected, Tracking and Targeted, depending on the accuracy of the fix and whether a unit's course and speed has been derived. Of course for ESM to work the enemy must 'co-operate' by using their emitters.

The fact that a missile launched on a passive fix from over-the-horizon is usually deadly, creates a central problem for a naval force—when, and even if, units should radiate, and if not how to detect the enemy? This is detectability vs. survivability. The need to obtain a targeting solution has to be balanced against the enemy's ability to do the same. Although once a commander feels that his fleet's position is known to the enemy a move to active emissions may be vital to prevent destruction, or else the only warning of incoming missiles will be when they turn on their terminal guidance systems.

Making this decision is called EMCON (EMissions CONtrol). There are three states, A, B and C. A is no emissions, B is limited emissions (no unique emissions), and C is unrestricted. EMCON is not a blanket condition across the fleet. The surface units can be at A while a sufficiently distant AEW aircraft can be at C.

ECM is both offensive and defensive, covering all methods used to deny targeting information to an enemy. Offensive ECM is usually jamming. This prevents the accurate detection and identification of incoming strikes until the jamming unit is destroyed. Chaff is also used to confuse AAW operations by creating radar decoys. Defensive ECM also uses chaff as well as soids, blip enhancement and jamming of missile terminal homers.

ASW operations 
Submarines are the greatest threat to offensive CVSG (carrier strike group) operations. The stealth of modern submarines (anechoic coatings, sound-damping equipment mountings, hydrodynamic design, etc.), can allow a submarine to get extremely close to an HVU target. The move towards shallow-water operations has greatly increased this threat. The threat is such that even the suspicion of the presence of a submarine means a fleet must commit resources to removing it, as the possible consequences of an undetected submarine are too serious to ignore.  In most cases submarines have an upper hand in any naval combat.

Sonar operation 
The main detection equipment to both sides in ASW is sonar. In the ocean the main factor affecting sonar operation is temperature. Ocean temperature varies with depth, but at between 25 and 90 m (90 and 300 ft) there is often a marked change—the thermocline, also simply called the layer. This divides the warmer surface water and the cold, still waters that make up the rest of the ocean. Regarding sonar, a sound originating from one side of the thermocline tends to remain on that side—it is 'reflected' off the layer change—unless it is very noisy (active sonar, cavitation, firing weapons, explosions etc.). Pressure, salinity and the turbulence of the water also affect sound propagation.

Water pressure creates convergence zones (CZ). Sound waves that are radiated down into the ocean bend back up to the surface in great arcs due to the effect of pressure on sound. Under the right conditions these waves will then reflect off the surface and repeat another arc. Each arc is called a CZ annulus. CZs are found every 33 nautical miles (61 km) forming a pattern of concentric circles around the sound source. Sounds that can be detected for only a few miles in a direct line can therefore also be detected hundreds of miles away. The signal is naturally attenuated but modern sonar suites are very sensitive.

As in all EW, the issue with sonar is passive versus active.  Modern active sonar is limited to 250 dB (decibels), but this level of noise can be detected at about ten times the range that is useful to the operator, acting as a beacon to any submarine in 100–190 km. So a target needs to be nearby and preferably on the same side of the layer to be detected by active sonar, which amounts to a favorable attack position for the submarine.

In passive sonar operation the thermocline is the major issue. On passive detection the radiated noise of a unit is only apparent across the layer in a narrow cone: undetectable unless units pass almost directly over or under each other. For a surface unit there is the option of towing a passive sonar array above or below the thermocline - variable depth sonar (VDS).

A VDS passive array can be put below the layer to detect approaching submarines and when the target is within strike range a brief and unit-selective move to active transmissions can quickly return a targeting solution. An added advantage of VDS is that while it is operating below the layer, a unit's hull-mounted systems can be used above the layer.

VDS is a blue-water solution. In shallow water, the high levels of biological, wave and tide noise, the influx of fresh water from rivers and the lack of a thermal gradient — and therefore CZs — make it a truly formidable environment to detect a sub-surface threat. Passive detection is almost impossible and surface units are forced to use active sonar to search. Doctrine is that a fleet must act as if they have already been detected and maybe even targeted when navigating close to shore or in shallow waters.

ASW triad 
For successful ASW, a fleet must combine surface, air and subsurface assets in the most tactically efficient manner - if these assets are present. ASW engagements occur in three phases: 
 Detected - From any source a submarine is possibly (POSSUB) or probably (PROBSUB) in the area.
 Localized - A submarine contact has been localized to a sufficiently small area to allow an attack with some chance of success.
 Targeted - The submarine's bearing, range, course and speed are known with sufficient accuracy to attack with a high probability of success.

Area ASW is the coordination of search ahead of the main force, along the threat axis. Detection and localization are the objectives, with destruction if possible. At best, area ASW is conducted by units with endurance and potency: maritime patrol aircraft (MPA) at 150 nautical miles (280 km) out or towed-array equipped surface units 30 to 50 nautical miles (60 to 90 km) out are most common. If the air unit has magnetic anomaly detection (MAD) as well as sonobuoys then so much the better.

Local ASW is within the outer screen, 12 to 25 nautical miles (22 to 46 km) from the main fleet. Detection is strictly passive as the distance is still great enough for the HVUs to be safe. Once a contact has been made, helicopter ASW assets (with dipping sonar, MAD or sonobuoys) are rushed into the area. Three or more close passive contacts are enough for aerial delivery of torpedoes. Ship-mounted ASW weapons such as ASROC are reserved for when a contact is too close—generally less effective, their role is to distract the submarine from attacking and buy time for a more effective strike. In modern combat depth charges are never used; they are ineffective and have been completely replaced by guided torpedoes.

If a submarine is detected after it penetrates to the inner screen, the issue becomes getting weapons in the water, even if they are not accurately targeted. All and any efforts to distract the submarine from attacking the HVUs are made. Torpedo evasion maneuvers are also necessary.

A general maneuver tactic against submarines is a zig-zag. A submarine usually relies on passive detection, not risking active sonar or a periscope observation. So to determine where a unit is heading the submarine needs Target motion analysis (TMA). This requires several minutes of passive contact and if the contact starts to zig-zag this process must restart.

The most effective means of finding and destroying submarines is another submarine. Called Hunter-Killers, they utilize the stealth advantage of submarines to track enemy submarines. The difficulty is that they have to be out of communication with the units they are protecting for most of the time to use this stealth. Therefore, most submarines operate independently, having been given general rules of engagement (ROE) for reconnaissance, ESM and early offensive operations. Modern diesel submarines are almost as efficient as SSNs as Hunter-Killers. However diesel submarines lack the capability to stay with a fast moving battle group due to their slower speeds (20 knots instead of 35 knots for SSNs) requiring them to be deployed long before operations in a particular area will commence, or force the battle group to slow down to allow their diesel submarines to keep up. Diesel Hunter-killer submarines or SSKs would generally be deployed along the “choke points” formed by landmasses or shallow waters to interdict enemy submarines long before they could attack the battle group while the SSNs would tend to stay with the battle group.

Anti-air warfare operations 
The central weapon in modern naval combat is the missile. This can be delivered from surface, subsurface or air units. With missile speeds ranging up to Mach 4 or higher, engagement time may be only seconds.

The key to successful Anti-air warfare (AAW) is to destroy the launching platform before it fires, thus removing a number of missile threats in one go. This is not always possible so a fleet's AAW resources need to be balanced between the outer and inner air battles.

There are several limitations to Surface-to-Air missiles (SAMs). Modern missiles are commonly semi-active homing. They need the firing unit to actively illuminate the target with a missile fire-control director throughout the flight. If a guiding director shuts down then the missiles still in flight will self-destruct. So the number of intercepts a unit can simultaneously prosecute is limited by the number of directors possessed. The use of directors exposes the firing unit to counterattack.

Clearly this is not a good situation and the US Navy has spent vast sums overcoming this limitation. The result is the Aegis combat system — phased-array radar and time-sharing technologies combined with missiles that have an inertial flight mode, allowing intercepts to be spaced more closely together. However, this is a partial solution at best, as the most numerous classes of ships with the Aegis combat system only have three or four illuminators, so only three or four missiles can be engaged at once.

Airborne early warning 
The key to successful anti-air warfare is airborne early warning. If attacking units can be identified before they reach their launch points then the battle can occur at the outer air-battle screen rather than the inner screen. An AEW unit in a race-track loiter 100 nautical miles (190 km) ahead of the PIM, with a fighter escort, is perfect.

Outer air battle 
In this area the interceptor aircraft of the Combat Air Patrol (CAP) are the principal element, whether originating from a CVBG or land base. CAP units protecting units other than their home base are called LORCAP (LOng Range CAP).

The CAP is usually positioned 160 to 180 nautical miles (300 to 330 km) from the units to be protected, along the expected threat axis. At this point the units will wait in a fuel saving loiter to engage incoming groups with AA missiles. As the engagements progress, relief units are dispatched to the CAP to ensure that later attacks are met with full weapon loads. If attacking units penetrate the outer defences they can be intercepted with aircraft in ready-5 status, if used.

Inner air battle 
Within the main body, ship-based AAW is the main protection. AAW shooters are, in best practice, positioned to provide both layered and overlapping coverage. The optimum firing position is directly between the target and the inbound missiles. If the missile passes a unit on a tangent (a crossing shot) the probability of a kill (Pk) is greatly reduced. The US Navy prefers that Aegis equipped units should be kept in close proximity to the units of high value, with less able AAW units no more than 10 nautical miles (19 km) out along the threat axis with, if possible, further AAW assets 18 to 24 nautical miles (33 to 44 km) out.

Other AAW tactics include the use of picket ships in a silent SAM or missile trap. In a missile trap, if the main body is forced to use active emissions (they are already detected and localized) then one or two ships can be positioned in emission silence 100 to 150 nautical miles (190 to 280 km) out. When other units detect an incoming raid, the unit (usually a cruiser) can go active as the raid moves into their engagement envelope. However once these units go active,  they are unsupported and are vulnerable to individual attack.

Silent SAM is a technological tactic. Some modern missiles can be fired from one platform with targeting and guidance from another platform and need never illuminate the targets themselves.

Anti-surface warfare operations 
Traditionally, surface naval combat was fought with large-caliber guns within visual range, but with modern anti-surface warfare, missiles, aircraft and submarine-launched torpedoes are now the predominant anti-ship weapons, with guns serving a secondary function.

See also 
 Modern naval tactics
 Carrier strike group

References

Suggested reading
 
 
 
 
 

Carrier Group
Tactics, modern
Aircraft carriers